Generation Unleashed is the fourth live album from American worship band of the annual Generation Unleashed conference in Portland, Oregon.  The album was released on January 29, 2008 under Maranatha! Music.

Track listing

Personnel

Jeremy Scott - lead vocals, acoustic guitar, producer, pre/post production
Donna Lasit - lead vocals, piano, producer
Jordan Filip - lead vocals, background vocals, assistant producer
Esther Filip - lead vocals, background vocals
Lisa Trent - background vocals
Yasuhito Hontani - electric guitar
Jer Leary - electric guitar, background vocals
Stephen Bostwick - electric guitar
Matt Bushard - bass
Isaac Tarter - keyboard
Jay Sudarma - drums, graphic design

Additional production
Doug Lasit - executive producer
Randy Alward - executive producer
Ryan Callahan - FOH engineer
Chris Chesnutt - FOH assistant
David Benton - monitor engineer
Brian Lawrence - engineer, pre/post production
Takahiro Fujii - engineer, pre/post production
Andy Dodd - mixing
Adam Watts - mixing
Nic Rodriguez - mixing assistant
Robert Hadley - mastering
Chris Corrado - graphic design
Nathan Scott - photography
Jim Dahm - photography
Garrett Syfrett - stage lighting

Notes
The band is based out of City Bible Church in Portland, Oregon and has been around since 1993 for the annual youth conference: Generation Unleashed.
Some versions of the album come with a bonus DVD which include bonus material regarding the release.

References

External links
AllMusic overview and review of Generation Unleashed
Generation Unleashed website
BridgeCity website
City Bible Church website

2008 live albums
Contemporary Christian music albums by American artists